The Emancipation of Mimi is the tenth studio album by American R&B singer Mariah Carey, released through Island Records on April 12, 2005. The album was considered Carey's "comeback album" by critics and became her highest-selling release in the US in a decade. In composing the album, Carey collaborated with many songwriters and producers throughout 2004, including Jermaine Dupri, Snoop Dogg, Kanye West, Twista, Nelly, Pharrell Williams, and James "Big Jim" Wright, many of whom appeared as featured guests on select tracks.

Carey opted to use her personal nickname 'Mimi' in the title, revealing a more intimate side of the singer, as seen in the album's declarative theme of emancipation from her personal and commercial setbacks. Although it has similar vocal production to her previous works and an inclination towards her signature ballads, the album encompasses dance-oriented and uptempo styles in keeping with its celebratory motif. The Emancipation of Mimi garnered critical acclaim, with praise towards its production, Carey's vocal performance, with critics noting the theme of independence and lack of restraint, dubbing the album a "party" record. 

The album garnered eight nominations at the 48th Grammy Awards, including for Album of the Year, and won three awards, including Best Contemporary R&B Album. It became Carey's first album since Butterfly (1997) to debut at number one on the US Billboard 200, selling over 404,000 copies in its first week and becoming the country's best-selling album of 2005. Internationally, it topped the charts in Greece, and reached the top-five in Canada, Denmark, France, and Japan, and was the world's second best-selling album of the year. The Emancipation of Mimi has sold over 10 million copies worldwide making it one of the best-selling albums of the 21st century.

"It's Like That" became one of her highest-charting songs in years, reaching the top twenty in several countries. "We Belong Together" accumulated 14 weeks at number one in the US, and was later hailed "song of the decade" by Billboard. It reached number one in Australia, number two in the United Kingdom and New Zealand, and achieved top-five positions in several European countries. To promote the album, Carey embarked on her sixth concert tour, entitled The Adventures of Mimi, starting on July 22, 2006, and ending on October 28, 2006.

Background 
In 2001, Carey had experienced critical, commercial, personal, and professional struggles, following the poor reception to her debut film Glitter (2001). The picture was panned by critics and earned less than eight million dollars at the box office. After posting a personally expressive letter on her official site, Carey checked into a hospital in Connecticut because of an "emotional and physical breakdown". Following the film's and soundtrack's poor performance, Virgin Records America bought out Carey's unprecedented $100 million recording contract. The company paid her $28 million to part ways. Carey flew to Capri, Italy, after her two-week hospitalization. During her five-month stay, she began to write a new studio album, using experiences she had gone through in recent months as inspirational themes. After being signed by Island Records and starting her own imprint, MonarC Entertainment, Carey released her intended "comeback" album Charmbracelet. Critics deemed it a strong improvement over Glitter, but not something that would re-establish her popularity as in the early stages of her career.

After enduring three years of "carping" from critics, Carey planned her return to music. On November 18, 2004, she revealed on her website that the name of the album would be The Emancipation of Mimi. While Carey was recording the album, Island Records executive L.A. Reid had learned that close friends referred to the singer as "Mimi". He had told Carey, "I feel your spirit on this record. You should use that name in the title, because that's the fun side of you that people don't get to see – the side that can laugh at the diva jokes, laugh at the breakdown jokes, laugh at whatever they want to say about you and just live life and enjoy it." Carey explained that Mimi is a "very personal nickname" only used by those in her inner circle, and thus the title meant she was letting her guard down and inviting her fans to be that much closer to her. She thought that naming her album The Emancipation of Mariah Carey would be "obnoxious".

Writing and recording 
During a visit to a recording studio, Carey was given a beat by the Legendary Traxster. On a later date, she met with American rapper Twista backstage after a show. When Carey mentioned the track, Twista told her that the beat had been originally intended for him, and that he had already written lyrics for it. They decided to collaborate on the track, which later was titled "One and Only". In the following months, Carey wrote and co-produced several songs including "Say Somethin' (with Snoop Dogg and The Neptunes), "To the Floor" (with Nelly), and "Fly Like a Bird" with James "Big Jim" Wright. By November, she felt that she had composed enough good material for The Emancipation of Mimi. After Reid listened to the album, however, he suggested the singer compose a few more "strong" singles to ensure the project's commercial success. Based on his recommendation, Carey met with Jermaine Dupri in Atlanta for a brief studio session, since Reid felt she had written some of her best work with him. During this two-day trip, Carey and Dupri wrote and produced "Shake It Off" and "Get Your Number", which were released as the album's third and fourth singles. Following this recording session, "Shake It Off" was briefly selected as the album's lead single, replacing the other contenders, "Stay The Night" and "Say Somethin'". Carey later returned to Atlanta for a second meeting with Dupri; they then penned the last two songs for the album: "We Belong Together" and "It's Like That". In an interview for Billboard, Carey described her sentiments regarding "It's Like That" during the production stage:
I had the chills. I had a great feeling about it when we finished writing the song, and I was flying back from Atlanta at some crazy hour of the morning ... But we were listening to it on the plane ride on the way home, and even from the demo version, I really felt something very special.
Carey and her management then decided to release "It's Like That" as the album's lead single, calling it "the right fire-starter". The singer has praised Dupri for being "focused", and felt that together they had composed some of her favorite songs on the album. She has told MTV, "The album is not about making the older executives happy by making a bring-down-the-house, tearjerker ballad, or [something] steeped in the media dramas of my life. What I tried to do was keep the sessions very sparse, underproduced, like in '70s soul music ... " According to Reid, Carey intended for the album to feature a more unpolished sound than her previous releases. The singer had been frustrated with the overproduction on many of her previous records, due to the inclusion of what she considered unnecessary "bells and whistles". She opted to record the majority of The Emancipation of Mimi live, alongside the band. Reid agreed with this decision and felt that the live vocals made the album sound more authentic.

Composition 
The Emancipation of Mimi was Carey's most expressive album to that point according to Fox News; it signified her creative freedom, as she had been oppressed by the expectations of record executives in the past. They noted the album's motif of professional and cultural emancipation throughout many songs. In an interview with the Hartford Courant, Carey spoke about the album's lack of creative restraint she felt was not featured on Charmbracelet. The latter album harbored on reviving Carey's popularity among the adult contemporary radio audience, following her decline with Glitter, which found the singer sampling 1980s melodies. While featuring ballads similar to those on Charmbracelet, the songs on The Emancipation of Mimi drew influence from R&B and hip hop, and were composed at an elevated tempo. According to Dimitri Ehrlich, an editor from Vibe, the album includes many musical facets:
Mimi pulls Carey in two opposite directions. Most of the tracks find her paired with the hottest hip hop producers of the day; there, she exercises restraint and settles into a groove. But on the rest, she does what comes most naturally to her—belting to her heart's desire, perhaps to mollify those who don't care much for her detours into raunchier rap territory.
The Emancipation of Mimi explores various genres; Greg Kot of the Chicago Tribune felt that the album effectively combines "elements of hip-hop and rhythm and blues into pop songs that appeal to a broad cross-section of listeners." According to Billboard staff, "Carey's emancipation is drenched in hip-hop and old-school R&B ballads". Alyssa Rashbaum of MTV deemed the record "a predominantly pop and R&B effort [...] tinged with hip-hop inflections. Meanwhile, AllMusic's Stephen Thomas Erlewine considered The Emancipation of Mimi "a slick, highly crafted piece of dance-pop". Aside from the ballads and uptempo tracks, The Emancipation of Mimi incorporates elements of soul and 1970s-inspired genres, as evident on the gospel-tinged closing track, "Fly Like a Bird". While most tracks derive instrumentation from live bands and musical instruments, some of the uptempo songs feature computerized arrangements and synthesizers. Stylistically, critics considered the album Carey's most diverse record in years, and one that highlighted many different production choices and techniques.

"It's Like That" was written and produced by Carey and Jermaine Dupri. It features hand claps and whistles, as well as ad-libs and verses from Dupri and Fat Man Scoop. The song's bassline and chord progression are aligned with piano and string notes. Its lyrics are arranged to portray the singer during a celebration: "I came to have a party / Open off that Bacardi ... Purple taking me higher / I'm lifted and I like it." Sal Cinquemani of Slant Magazine praised its lyrics and beat, and felt the song prepares listeners for the album's "party theme". Lyrically, "We Belong Together" was described as a "broken-hearted lament for love"; it features finger-snaps, kick drums, and a piano-driven melody.
Carey composed the gospel-influenced ballad "Fly Like a Bird" with James Wright. The lyrics are in the form of a prayer that conveys a message of unconditional love for God. The song features a verbal recording of Carey's pastor, Clarence Keaton, who reads two verses from the Bible. The singer wrote the album's fifth cut "Say Somethin, which features rap verses from Snoop Dogg and was produced by The Neptunes. Vibe writer Dimitri Ehrlich described it as "a musical oddity", and characterized the production as "strange instrumentation, weird melodic shifts, hectic drum patterns and a bed of synths." Lyrically, the protagonist makes sexual advances to a romantic interest with the line "If it's worth your while, do something good to me." When interpreting the lyrics in the female role, Cummings noted "a shy woman who doesn't need to say anything at all to get a man's attention."

Carey wrote "Mine Again" alongside producer James Poyser. The ballad has electronic keyboard notes, a rhythmic vinyl sound, and melodies from gospel and R&B genres. "Stay the Night" was produced by Carey and Kanye West, and samples a piano loop from Ramsey Lewis's 1971 cover version of "Betcha by Golly, Wow". In the lyrics, the protagonist faces the dilemma of spending the night with an ex-lover, although he is in another relationship. "Get Your Number" samples the hook from British band Imagination's 1982 single "Just an Illusion", and derives its production from "'80s-esque synthesizers" and computerized musical instruments. Lawrence Ferber from the Windy City Times described "Shake It Off" as a "playful approach to bitterness—and, more specifically, a cheatin' bad apple", with lyrics such as "I gotta shake you off / Just like a Calgon commercial". In an interview with Ferber, Carey described the track as her favorite from The Emancipation of Mimi: "'Shake It Off' can apply to anything. Whatever personal dramas we go through, put that song on and you lose the anxiety or intensity of the moment. I'll listen to that song when I've just come out of an annoying meeting. I gotta shake this off." Editor Jon Pareles from The New York Times felt that the album follows a formula that was most apparent on "Shake It Off": "On this album, the verses stay in a narrow range, the choruses glide higher, and at the ends of some songs, Ms. Carey gives herself a few of her old sky-high notes as a background flourish."

Release and promotion 

The Emancipation of Mimi was released by The Island Def Jam Music Group for download and as a CD in Mexico on April 12, 2005. On April 4, 2005, the album was released in Australia and New Zealand. In the United Kingdom, The Emancipation of Mimi was distributed through Mercury Records. The following day, the album was made available in Canada through the Universal Music Group. On April 12, 2005, it became available in France, Japan, and the United States, and was released on May 11, 2005, in China. On British and Japanese versions of the album, "Sprung" and "Secret Love" were included as bonus tracks.

A reissue of The Emancipation of Mimi, subtitled Ultra Platinum Edition, was released on November 15, 2005, accompanied by the reissue's lead single "Don't Forget About Us". The reissue was released in two versions. The first was a CD with four bonus tracks: "Don't Forget About Us" (co-written and co-produced by Carey with Jermaine Dupri), the album's only single; "Makin' It Last All Night (What It Do)", featuring Dupri; the "We Belong Together" remix, featuring American rappers Styles P and Jadakiss; and a new version of the 2006 single "So Lonely" by Twista (which originally featured Carey), in which she sings an additional verse. The second version of the album was a limited-edition set of the CD and a DVD, which includes the videos from The Emancipation of Mimi that had then been released ("It's Like That", "We Belong Together", "Shake It Off", and "Get Your Number"), along with the then-recently filmed video for "Don't Forget About Us". The album became the first domestic release of the video for "Get Your Number", which had previously been released only in Europe."Sprung" and "Secret Love" were later included as bonus tracks in the 2020 digital reissue of Ultra Platinum Edition.

Carey began a promotional tour in support of the album, beginning on April 2, 2005, at the German Echo Awards. Two days later, she performed "It's Like That" on the game show Wetten, dass..?. In the UK, the singer filmed a two-part appearance on the British music program Top of the Pops, performing the album's first three singles. Carey launched the stateside release of the album on Good Morning America with an interview and a five-piece outdoor concert. Taking place in Times Square and attracting the largest crowd to the plaza since the 2004 New Year's Eve celebration, the concert featured the first three singles from the album in addition to "Fly Like a Bird" and "Make It Happen" (1991). During the following week, she performed "We Belong Together" at the 2005 BET Awards, and appeared at the annual VH1 Save the Music special, which was broadcast live on April 17. Throughout May, Carey performed "We Belong Together" on the Late Show with David Letterman (May 5), The Tonight Show with Jay Leno (May 11), The Ellen DeGeneres Show (May 13) and on The Oprah Winfrey Show (May 24).

During the 2005 MTV Video Music Awards, Carey performed at the National Hotel in South Beach. Accompanied by Dupri, she sang "Shake It Off" and the official remix version of "We Belong Together". She was a headlining performer at the 2005 Fashion Rocks, in Monaco. On November 15, 2005, Carey performed "Shake It Off" and her newly released single from the album's re-release, "Don't Forget About Us", during half-time of the Thanksgiving game between the Detroit Lions and the Atlanta Falcons. On November 22, 2005, she opened the 33rd annual American Music Awards with "Don't Forget About Us". Two months later, she placed as the featured performer at the Times Square Ball drop on New Year's Eve in New York. At the 48th Grammy Awards, on February 8, 2006, Carey returned to the Grammy stage for the first time since 1996. Her performance began with a pre-taped video in which she discussed the importance of God and religion in her life. She then came to the stage, and sang a shortened version of "We Belong Together", followed by "Fly like a Bird". The performance induced the only standing ovation that night, and earned praise from critics.

Singles 

"It's Like That" was released as the album's lead single on January 7, 2005. Critics predicted that the song would re-ignite Carey's popularity among MTV viewers. It became her highest-charting song internationally in years, and peaked at number sixteen on the US Billboard Hot 100.

"We Belong Together", the album's second single, became one of the biggest hits of Carey's career. It became her sixteenth chart topping single in the US, spending fourteen weeks on the Hot 100's peak; the longest stay of any song during the 2000s. Aside from breaking several Nielsen BDS records, the song was named "song of the 2000s decade" by Billboard. "We Belong Together" also topped the charts in Australia and attained a top-five peak in New Zealand, the Netherlands, Denmark, Spain, Switzerland, and the UK.

"Shake It Off" was the third single released from The Emancipation of Mimi. It peaked at number two on the Hot 100, being barred from the top position by Carey's previous single, "We Belong Together". It became the first time in Billboard history that a female artist occupied the top two spots on the chart as a lead artist. It was released as a double A-side with "Get Your Number" in the UK and Australia, where it reached the top ten.

"Don't Forget About Us" was released as the lead single from Ultra Platinum Edition, and overall fourth single from the album. The song became Carey's seventeenth chart topper in the US, tying her with Elvis Presley for the most number-one singles by a solo artist (a record she surpassed in 2008 with "Touch My Body"). "Fly Like a Bird" was released as the fifth single from the album in the US, followed by "Say Somethin'". "Mine Again" was not released as a single, but peaked at number 73 on Billboards Hot R&B/Hip-Hop Songs chart due to sales.

Tour 

Sixteen months after the release of the album, Carey announced her first headlining tour in three years, named The Adventures of Mimi: The Voice, The Hits, The Tour after a "Carey-centric fan's" music diary. Beginning on July 22, 2006, and ending on October 28, the tour spanned forty stops, with thirty-two in the US and Canada, two in Africa, and six in Japan. The tour featured the singer's long-time friend Randy Jackson as the musical director. In an interview for the Associated Press, Carey described the tour's direction, as well as the music she would perform:
With this tour, I'm going to be working on some different arrangements for some of the older songs, to ... give it a little more life to them. That's not to say they're going to sound totally different and to freak anybody out ... I love re-singing songs to different music. I genuinely want to tour with these new songs, as well as older hits. These new songs mean so much to me, this time of my life has been so wonderful for me, and I want to experience that with my fans.
The tour received a generally mixed reception from critics who praised the singer's vocal performances but called the show's excesses, such as the singer's frequent costume changes and pre-filmed clips, distracting. In Tunis, Carey played to 80,000 people during two concerts. Midway through the tour, she booked a two-night concert in Hong Kong, scheduled for after her Japanese shows. The performances were cancelled after tickets went on sale; Carey's then-manager Benny Medina said the cancellation was because the concert promoter refused to pay the agreed compensation. The promoter blamed poor ticket sales (allegedly, only 4,000 tickets had sold) and "Carey's outrageous demands". Medina later disputed the promoter's ticket sales figure, saying that 8,000 tickets had been sold. He said Carey would have performed as long as she was compensated, regardless of attendance. Carey ultimately sued the promoter, claiming one million in damages for the concert's abrupt cancellation.

Critical reception 

The Emancipation of Mimi received a 64 out of 100 (indicating "generally positive reviews") on Metacritic, a website that averages professional reviews from critics into a numerical score. Stephen Thomas Erlewine of AllMusic called the album a "highly crafted piece of dance-pop" and "relative comeback" for Carey Michael Paoletta from Billboard was less critical of her vocals, writing that "while her voice has lost some of the power through the years, Mimi deftly showcases her still-considerable pipes with strong lyrics and slick production." Paoletta praised The Emancipation of Mimi as Carey's best album since Butterfly (1997). Michael Dougall Bell from the Calgary Sun called Carey's voice "very impressive". He concluded: "While Emancipation may not send Carey's stock or star back up to where it once was and where that voice deserves to be, at least she's not plummeting – she's merely levelled off." Entertainment Weekly editor Tom Sinclair noted that almost every song "showcases Carey's undeniable vocal strengths". Reviewing "Fly Like a Bird", Sinclair concluded, "It's so moving that we'll resist the temptation to be crass and interpret the song as a plea for heightened record sales. Help from above is always welcome, but Emancipation sounds like it just might do fine all on its own."

Jennifer Vineyard of MTV News considered the album's title to be influenced by Janet Jackson's Damita Jo, which was also based on an alternate persona. According to Jenson Macey from BBC News, The Emancipation of Mimi was Carey's strongest effort from the 2000s; he said that the album "took her straight back to the top of the A-List." Caroline Sullivan from The Guardian gave the album four stars out of five, calling it "cool, focused and urban." The New York Timess Jon Pareles complimented how Carey wrote all of the album's material. He felt the record's sound was fresh and innovative: "on The Emancipation of Mimi, she disciplines herself into coherence, using fewer tricks and sounding more believable. She also finds what lesser singers can take for granted: a certain lightness that eases her constant sense of control." Cummings from PopMatters gave the album seven stars out of ten, claiming it to be Carey's redemption from the manacles of her previous two releases. He praised the album's singles, but called some of its music "corny" and "unnecessarily overproduced". Todd Burns from Stylus Magazine gave the album a B−, admiring its assortment of beats and tempos. Burns, however, called some of The Neptunes and Dupri's production "ill-advised". He called some of Carey's vocals "strained, thin and airy". While considering it as an improvement over her previous releases of the decade, he concluded that it "suffers from the fact that her vocals have deteriorated – a simple fact of the ravages that her voice has undergone in the past fifteen years." Sal Cinquemani of Slant Magazine gave The Emancipation of Mimi three and a half stars out of five, calling it "redemption". He complimented its array of beats and its production. Critic Andre Meyer of CBS News thought the material on the album was "stronger" than on Charmbracelet, and described it as a move in Carey's long-term plan for pop domination, while giving off the "jittery R&B vibe that made Destiny's Child so potent." He added that "Mariah has returned to singing – while still pushing the limits of good taste with her barely there outfits."  In the updated edition for The 500 Greatest Albums of All Time published in 2020 by American magazine Rolling Stone, the album ranked at number 389.

Listicles

Commercial performance 

The Emancipation of Mimi became Carey's highest-selling album in the US since Daydream (1995). In its first week of release, it debuted at number one on the Billboard 200 (ousting 50 Cent's The Massacre from the top position) with 404,000 copies sold, the highest first-week sales in Carey's career, until E=MC² opened with 463,000 in 2008. On its second week on the chart, the album moved a spot down to number two and moved a further 226,000 units. It became her fifth number-one album in the country and her third album to debut at the top. The album returned to number one in its eighth week after selling 172,000 copies. It remained in the top ten for many months before dropping to number eleven on September 28, 2005. The album remained in the top twenty for thirty-one consecutive weeks, and stayed on for 74 weeks in total. It returned to the top five after the release of the Ultra Platinum Edition, which helped the album rebound to number four, with sales of 185,000 units. The Emancipation of Mimi was the best-selling album in the US in 2005, with nearly five million units sold. By the last full week of the year, the album outsold The Massacre, which had been released more than six weeks earlier. It was the first album by a solo female artist to become the year's best-selling album since Alanis Morissette's Jagged Little Pill in 1996. It reached the six million sales mark in the US in October 2013, and in September 2022, the album was certified seven-times platinum by the Recording Industry Association of America.

The Emancipation of Mimi entered the Australian Albums Chart on April 17, 2005, at number 13. During the following week, it peaked at and spent one week at number six. The album spent a total of forty-six weeks on the chart. It was certified platinum by the Australian Recording Industry Association (ARIA) – denoting shipments of 70,000 unit – and finished at number twenty-seven on the End of Year Chart. In Canada The Emancipation of Mimi debuted and peaked at number two on the Canadian Albums Chart, with first-week sales of 11,000 units. The album was certified triple platinum by the Canadian Recording Industry Association (CRIA) for shipments of 300,000 units. The Emancipation of Mimi debuted at number seven on the UK Albums Chart dated April 6, 2005. On July 23, fourteen weeks after its debut, the album once again reached its peak position of number seven. After one re-entry, the album spent a combined forty-three weeks in the albums chart, being certified double-platinum by the British Phonographic Industry (BPI) for shipments of 600,000 copies. By May 2008, the album's British sales stood at 621,352 units.

In France, the album debuted at its peak position of number four on April 9, 2005. The record spent a total of fifty-one weeks in the chart, and was certified gold by the Syndicat National de l'Édition Phonographique (SNEP), signifying shipments of 100,000 copies. Eight months after its release in Europe, the International Federation of the Phonographic Industry (IFPI) certified The Emancipation of Mimi platinum, denoting shipments of one million units throughout the continent. In Hong Kong it was awarded a Gold Disc Award, which is issued to the ten best-selling foreign albums each year. The Emancipation of Mimi debuted at number two on the Japanese Albums Chart, and was certified platinum (250,000 units shipped) by the Recording Industry Association of Japan (RIAJ). At the end of 2005, the IFPI reported that The Emancipation of Mimi had sold 7.7 million copies globally, and was the second best-selling album of the year, after Coldplay's X&Y. It was the best-selling album by a solo and female artist. As of October 2011, The Emancipation of Mimi has sold 10 million copies worldwide.

The Emancipation of Mimi was ranked as the 52nd best album of all time on the Billboard Top 200 Albums of All Time.

Accolades 
The Emancipation of Mimi received many awards and nominations. It earned ten Grammy Award nominations in 2006–07: eight in 2006 for the original release (the most received by Carey in a single year), and two in 2007 for Ultra Platinum Edition. In 2006, Carey won Best Contemporary R&B Album for The Emancipation of Mimi, as well as Best Female R&B Vocal Performance and Best R&B Song for "We Belong Together". Carey was nominated for, Album of the Year (The Emancipation of Mimi), Record of the Year ("We Belong Together"), Song of the Year ("We Belong Together"), Best Female Pop Vocal Performance ("It's Like That"), and Best Traditional R&B Vocal Performance ("Mine Again"). In 2007, "Don't Forget About Us" was nominated for Best Female R&B Vocal Performance and Best R&B Song.

The Emancipation of Mimi won the 2005 Soul Train Awards for Best R&B/Soul Album and Best Female R&B/Soul Album, and the 2005 Vibe Award for Album of the Year. Rolling Stone ranked the album at number 43 on its 2005 list of the year's best albums, and Entertainment Weekly ranked it at number 21 on their list of the "Top 100 Best Albums of the past 25 years". "We Belong Together" won a Teen Choice Award, a World Music Award, five Billboard Music Awards, four Radio Music Awards, and three Bambi Awards. "Shake It Off" and "Don't Forget About Us" won two additional Bambis. After Carey received the Bambi, the award drew media attention after it was stolen from the singer's dressing room.

Track listing 

Sample credits
 "It's Like That" samples "Hollis Crew" by Run-DMC and "La Di Da Di" by Doug E. Fresh and MC Ricky D
 "We Belong Together" samples "If You Think You're Lonely Now" by Bobby Womack and "Stares and Whispers" by Renée Geyer
 "Stay the Night" samples "Betcha by Golly Wow!" by Ramsey Lewis and "Who's in the House" by The 45 King
 "Get You Number" samples "Just an Illusion" by Imagination and "Weak at the Knees" by Steve Arrington
 "Your Girl" samples "A Life with You" by Adeaze
 "Sprung" samples "Do it Again" by The New Birth
 "Makin' It Last All Night (What It Do)" samples "Freek'n You" by Jodeci
 "We Belong Together" (Remix) samples "Two Occasions" by The Deele and "If You Think You're Lonely Now" by Bobby Womack

Personnel 
Credits for The Emancipation of Mimi are adapted from the album's liner notes.

 Mariah Carey – producer , executive producer, vocals , background vocals 
 Courtney Bradley – background vocals 
 Calvin Broadus – vocals 
 Rick Brunermer – flute , tenor saxophone 
 Jason Carson – assistant recording engineer 
 Dana Jon Chappelle – recording engineer 
 Andrew Coleman – recording engineer 
 Bryan-Michael Cox –  producer 
 Jeff Dieterie – trombone ,  bass trombone 
 Darryl Dixon – alto saxophone 
 Charley Drayton – drums 
 Jermaine Dupri –  producer , audio mixing ,  vocals 
 Manuel Farolfi – assistant recording engineer 
 Jason Finkel – assistant recording engineer 
 Isaac Freeman – additional rap vocals 
 Brian Frye – recording engineer 
 Brian Garten – recording engineer ,  audio mixing
 Cornell Haynes – vocals 
 Loris Holland – additional keyboards 
 John Horesco – recording engineer ,  audio mixing
 Chops Horns – horn 
 Chad Hugo – producer 
 Ken Duro Ifill – mixing
 Randy Jackson – bass 
 Jeffrey Lee Johnson – guitar 
 Rev. Dr. Clarence Keaton – talking voice 
 Michael Leedy – assistant recording engineer 
 Samuel "Legendary Traxster" Lindley – producer 
 Trey Lorenz –  background vocals 
 Manny Marroquin – audio mixing 
 Carl Mitchell –  vocals 
 Mike Pierce – recording engineer 
 James Phillips – producer 
 Jason Phillips – vocals
 Herb Power – mastering
 James Poyser – producer, keyboard 
 L.A. Reid – executive producer
 Joe Romano – flugelhorn, trumpet 
 Manuel Seal – producer 
 Ernesto Shaw – mixing
 Marc Shemer –  producer 
 Dexter Simmons – mixing
 David Styles – vocals
 Phil Tan – audio mixing 
 Maryann Tatum – background vocals 
 Sherry Tatum – background vocals 
 Pat Viala – audio mixing 
 Jeff Villanueva – engineer
 Kanye West – producer 
 Pharrell Williams – producer, additional vocals 
 James Wright – producer , keyboards

Charts

Weekly charts

Monthly charts

Year-end charts

Decade-end charts

All-time charts

Certifications and sales

See also 
 List of best-selling albums by women
 List of best-selling albums by year in the United States

References

External links 
 The Emancipation of Mimi at Metacritic

2005 albums
Albums produced by Bryan-Michael Cox
Albums produced by Rodney Jerkins
Albums produced by Jermaine Dupri
Albums produced by Kanye West
Albums produced by Scram Jones
Albums produced by Scott Storch
Albums produced by Swizz Beatz
Albums produced by the Neptunes
Albums produced by The Legendary Traxster
Island Records albums
Mariah Carey albums
Grammy Award for Best Contemporary R&B Album
Concept albums